The 2016 UEFA Women's Under-17 Championship was the ninth edition of the UEFA Women's Under-17 Championship, the annual European international youth football championship contested by the women's under-17 national teams of UEFA member associations. Belarus, which were selected by UEFA on 20 March 2012, hosted the tournament between 4 and 16 May 2016.
 
A total of eight teams played in the tournament, with players born on or after 1 January 1999 eligible to participate. Each match had a duration of 80 minutes, consisting of two halves of 40 minutes with a 15-minute half-time.

Same as previous editions held in even-numbered years, the tournament acted as the UEFA qualifiers for the FIFA U-17 Women's World Cup. The top three teams of the tournament qualified for the 2016 FIFA U-17 Women's World Cup in Jordan as the UEFA representatives.

Qualification

The national teams from 47 UEFA member associations entered the competition, which was a record total, including Andorra who entered a UEFA women's competition for the first time. With Belarus automatically qualified as hosts, the other 46 teams contested a qualifying competition to determine the remaining seven spots in the final tournament. The qualifying competition consisted of two rounds: the qualifying round, which took place in autumn 2015, and the elite round, which took place in spring 2016.

Qualified teams
The following eight teams qualified for the final tournament:

Notes

Final draw
The final draw was held on 6 April 2016, 11:30 FET (UTC+3), at the Victoria Hotel in Minsk, Belarus. The eight teams were drawn into two groups of four teams. There was no seeding, except that hosts Belarus were assigned to position A1 in the draw.

Venues
The tournament was hosted in five venues:

Squads
Each national team had to submit a squad of 18 players.

Match officials
A total of 6 referees, 8 assistant referees and 2 fourth officials were appointed for the final tournament.

Referees
 Eleni Antoniou (Greece)
 Ana Aguiar (Portugal)
 Dimitrina Milkova (Bulgaria)
 Elvira Nurmustafina (Kazakhstan)
 Tess Olofsson (Sweden)
 Vera Opeikina (Russia)

Assistant referees
 Oleksandra Ardasheva (Ukraine)
 Emilie Aubry (Switzerland)
 Helena Buh (Slovenia)
 Yelena Jermolajeva (Latvia)
 Bianca H.P. Scheffers (Netherlands)
 Kinga Seniuk-Mikulska (Poland)
 Sibel Yamac Tamkafa (Turkey)
 Kristina Yanuskevich (Kazakhstan)

Fourth officials
 Volha Tsiareshka (Belarus)
 Irina Turovskaya (Belarus)

Group stage

The final tournament schedule was confirmed on 7 April 2016.

The group winners and runners-up advanced to the semi-finals.

Tiebreakers
The teams were ranked according to points (3 points for a win, 1 point for a draw, 0 points for a loss). If two or more teams were equal on points on completion of the group matches, the following tie-breaking criteria were applied, in the order given, to determine the rankings:
Higher number of points obtained in the group matches played among the teams in question;
Superior goal difference resulting from the group matches played among the teams in question;
Higher number of goals scored in the group matches played among the teams in question;
If, after having applied criteria 1 to 3, teams still had an equal ranking, criteria 1 to 3 were reapplied exclusively to the group matches between the teams in question to determine their final rankings. If this procedure did not lead to a decision, criteria 5 to 9 applied;
Superior goal difference in all group matches;
Higher number of goals scored in all group matches;
If only two teams have the same number of points, and they were tied according to criteria 1 to 6 after having met in the last round of the group stage, their rankings were determined by a penalty shoot-out (not used if more than two teams had the same number of points, or if their rankings were not relevant for qualification for the next stage).
Lower disciplinary points total based only on yellow and red cards received in the group matches (red card = 3 points, yellow card = 1 point, expulsion for two yellow cards in one match = 3 points);
Drawing of lots.

All times were local, FET (UTC+3).

Group A

Group B

Knockout stage
In the knockout stage, penalty shoot-out was used to decide the winner if necessary (no extra time was played).

There was a third place match (i.e., FIFA U-17 Women's World Cup play-off) for this edition of the tournament as it was used as a qualifier for the FIFA U-17 Women's World Cup (since expansion to eight teams).

Bracket

Semi-finals
Winners qualified for 2016 FIFA U-17 Women's World Cup.

Third place match
Winner qualified for 2016 FIFA U-17 Women's World Cup.

Final

Goalscorers
5 goals

 Alessia Russo
 Lorena Navarro

4 goals

 Niamh Charles
 Vanessa Ziegler

3 goals

 Ellie Brazil
 Hannah Cain
 Anna Filbey
 Klara Bühl
 Sophie Haug

2 goals

 Grace Smith
 Georgia Stanway
 Ella Ann Toone
 Marie Müller
 Miljana Ivanović
 Silvia Rubio

1 goal

 Karolina Zhitko
 Tanja Pawollek
 Benedetta Glionna
 Frida Maanum
 Ingrid Olsen
 Emilia Ruud
 Jovana Agbaba
 Teodora Burkert
 Tijana Filipović
 Allegra Poljak
 María Blanco
 Natalia Ramos

1 own goal

 Sophia Kleinherne (playing against Spain)

Team of the Tournament

Goalkeepers
 Tanja Djapić
 Noelia Ramos

Defenders
 Markéta Klímová
 Tanja Pawollek
 Caroline Siems
 Laia Aleixandri
 Ona Batlle
 Lucía Rodríguez

Midfielders
 Georgia Stanway
 Janina Minge
 Frida Maanum
 Paula Fernández
 Silvia Rubio

Forwards
 Alessia Russo
 Klara Bühl
 Giulia Gwinn
 Allegra Poljak
 Candela Andújar

Qualified teams for FIFA U-17 Women's World Cup
The following three teams from UEFA qualified for the FIFA U-17 Women's World Cup.

1 Bold indicates champion for that year. Italic indicates host for that year.

References

External links

Belarus 2016, UEFA.com

 
2016
Women's Under-17 Championship
2016 Uefa Women's Under-17 Championship
2016 in women's association football
2016 in Belarusian football
May 2016 sports events in Europe
2016 in youth sport
2016 in youth association football